Male Barali Manju Irali ( is a 2009 Kannada-language drama film directed by Vijayalakshmi Singh. It stars Parvathy Thiruvothu, Srinagar Kitty, and Naga Kiran in the lead roles. The movie draws inspiration from Sabrina (1995 film) starring Harrison Ford, Julia Ormond, and Greg Kinnear and was directed by Sydney Pollack.
The film opened to positive reviews in July 2009.

Cast
Parvathy Thiruvothu as Sneha
Srinagar Kitty as Vishwas
Naga Kiran as Prem
Haripriya as Nayana
Hema Chaudhary
Jai Jagadish
Mukhyamantri Chandru
Umashree
Sharan
Sadhu Kokila

Production
Filming began during August 2008 and the film was shot for several months at a cost of 2.5 crore rupees. It was the first ever Kannada film to have been launched in the Kodagu district, which also served as the film's backdrop throughout the shoot. The shoot of the film was completed during May 2009, with Parvathy revealed to have helped work on the script of the film.

Soundtrack

Reception

Critical response 

R G Vijayasarathy of Rediff.com scored the film at 4 out of 5 stars and says "When most of the big Kannada stars are focusing on remakes, it is nice to see an original film like this made with lesser known stars. The success of the film will prove that the future of the Kannada film industry lies in original creation and not in copying. Male Barali Manju Irali is a film that you should not miss". A critic from The New Indian Express wrote "Over all "Male Barali Manju Irali" is an enjoyable fare, which could be appreciated for its narrative, direction and high voltage performances". A critic from Bangalore Mirror wrote  "Considerable care has been taken by the director to present an authentic setting for the emotional scenes which is ably aided by good camerawork. But unnecessary songs and some boring scenes keeps the film at a dull pace. Only Parvathy performance can bring in the crowds for this film".

References

2009 films
2000s Kannada-language films
Films scored by Mano Murthy
Films directed by Vijayalakshmi Singh